= Oro Nami =

Restaurant in Washington, D.C., U.S.

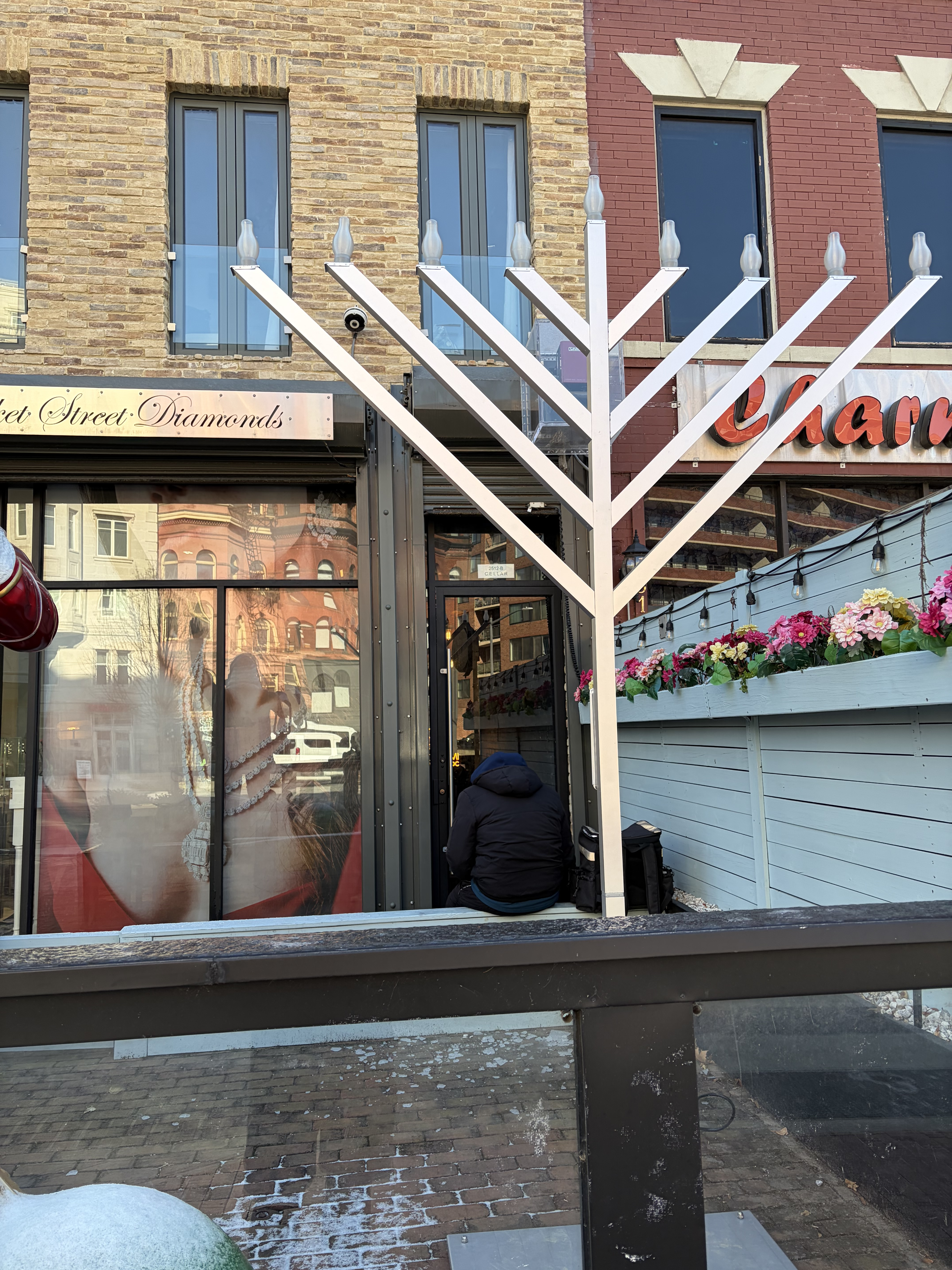
- Oro Nami's entrance in December 2025
- Interactive map of Oro Nami

Restaurant information
- Location: 2512 Pennsylvania Avenue NW, Washington, D.C., 20037, United States
- Coordinates: 38°54′13″N 77°3′14.1″W
- Website: oronamidc.com

Oro Nami is a restaurant in Washington, D.C.. Formerly known as a cocktail bar called The Setting, it converted to a kosher sushi restaurant in June 2025.
